Gaps is a solitaire card game. 

Gaps or GAPs may also refer to:
Gaps (album), an album by Monster Bobby
GAPs or GTPase activating protein, a protein molecule
GAPS or General Antiparticle Spectrometer, a dark matter detection experiment

See also
Gap (disambiguation)
Gaps and gores, real estate missed out when defining boundaries 
Gaps of the Allegheny, a series of escarpment-eroding water gaps in the Allegheny range
GAPPS (disambiguation)